The general lines of diachronics of Lombard and Piedmontese plural declension are drawn here:

Feminine
In Lombard and Piedmontese, feminine plural is generally derived from Latin first declension accusative -as (compare ); nouns from other classes first collapsed there; some concrete realisations are:
-as > -a
-as > -es > -e
-as > -es > -ei > -i
-as > -es > -ei > -i > -e
-as > -es > -ei > -i > -∅

Masculine
On the contrary, masculine plural is generally derived from Latin second declension nominative -i; this suffix eventually drops or
gives rise to palatalisation or metaphonesis; some concrete realisations are:
-li > -lj > -gl > -j
-ni > -nj > -gn
-ti > -tj > -cc
Metaphonesis (in regression) : orti > öört;
Neutralisation: -i > -∅

See also
Western Lombard
Eastern Lombard
Piedmontese
Romance plurals

References

G.Hull: the linguistic unity of Northern Italy and Rhaetia, PhD thesis, University of Sydney West (1982)
E.Banfi, G.Bonfadini, P.Cordin, M.Iliescu:  Italia Settentrionale: Crocevia di idiomi Romanzi, Atti del convegno internazionale di studi, Trent 21-23 Ottobre 1993 Niemayer, Tübingen, 1995

Lombard language
Piedmontese language
Grammatical number
Romance languages